The Horses and the Hounds is the tenth studio album by American singer James McMurtry. It was released on 20 August 2021 through New West Records.

Critical reception
According to Metacritic, The Horses and the Hounds has a score of 81 out of 100, indicating that it has received "universal acclaim" from music critics. In Paste, Geoffrey Himes wrote that "on this record, McMurtry sings in the first person as if he were an old man phoning from Canada to an old friend who had briefly been a lover; as if he were a mentally unbalanced man who shoots his best friend for no good reason; as if he were a homeless truck driver living in a series of motels; as if he were a husband with a flat tire, an angry wife and no internet. None of those characters are him, but he’s such a good actor as a singer that it’s easy to believe he is."

Writing for Pitchfork, Stephen M. Deusner said "McMurtry has become what’s known as a songwriter's songwriter: someone whose facility with words and influence on other artists far outstrip his mainstream notoriety and album sales". Deusner stated that The Horses and the Hounds saw McMurtry focus on "his favorite subjects", and that "McMurtry sounds more engaged here, more focused, and more generous to his hard-luck characters".

Slant writer Jeremy Winograd opined that "McMurtry has always been a superb, instinctive storyteller, using his characters as conduits to get at more profound truth than a more diaristic lyricist might", and that The Horses and the Hounds not only features "no shortage of great stories", but details that "betray a self-aware preoccupation with aging that lend the album a more endearingly personal bent than his previous efforts".

Track listing
Credits adapted from Tidal. All tracks are produced by Ross Hogarth.

Charts

Release history

References

2021 albums
James McMurtry albums